Sorbus 'Gibbsii' is a cultivar of the rowan genus Sorbus. It is a tree with white flowers and small, bright red, round or oval berry-like fruits that are really pomes. It is an important food source for birds and other wildlife. It is also popular as an ornamental plant. It is also used as a street tree.

External links
Sorbus gibbsii info
Sorbus gibbsii Picture
Sorbus gibbsii Picture

Gibbsii